Ao Vivo (Live in English) is the second album of Banda Calypso. It was recorded live on October 18, 2000 in the Lamb's Exhibition Park in Recife, and being released in February 2001. On this album are hits from his first album, like Dançando Calypso, Amor nas Estrelas, Disse Adeus (which was the first song of the disclosed band in town ), among others. This album marks the exit of the band Belém to Brazilian Northeast. The album sold over 1.2 million copies and established the band on the national scene.

Content 
In this disc the band out of rhythm Calipso stronger in their previous songs and in his new rhythms repertoire as Cúmbia, lambada, carimbó that are present the new songs brought to disk as Cúmbia do Amor, Dudu, Odalisca, Lambada Complicada (music where there is only instrumental sound, played by Chimbinha), among others, plus a bonus track in the studio, Como Uma Virgem.

Relaunching and differences 
The disc was released without edits the tracks Loirinha and the two Potpourri of Carimbó 1 and 2, both songs sung by Dinho. The singer acted on stage in the interval Joelma, when itself had finished its block on the show and was going to change costume, so continuing the show. The album was well received by the public even without mass release had great bandage.

Track listing
1st edition

2nd edition

2001 live albums
Portuguese-language live albums
Banda Calypso albums